is a Japanese actress.

Career
Katayama started her career as a fashion model in Paris, Milano, New York, Los Angeles and Tokyo. In 2007, Katayama was chosen to star in Osamu Minorikawa’s film, Life Can Be So Wonderful. In 2008, she was a regular on TV drama series Ashita no Kita Yoshio on Fuji TV. In 2012, Katayama starred as the heroine in Koji Wakamatsu’s Petrel Hotel Blue (which had a special showing at the Busan Film Festival), and in 2013, again in Koji Wakamatsu's film The Millennial Rapture (featured at the Venice Film Festival). In 2014, she appeared in Takashi Miike's Over Your Dead Body and Sion Sono's Tokyo Tribe.

Filmography

Film
 Life Can Be So Wonderful (2007)
 Karakuri (2010)
  The Third (2010)
 Mahoroba (2011)
   Black Hair (2011)
  Ringing in their ears (2011)
 Sukiyaki (2011)
  The Detective is in the Bar (2011)
 Petrel Hotel Blue (2012)
  The Millennial Rapture (2012)
  Over Your Dead Body (2014)
  Tokyo Tribe (2014)

Television
Ashita no Kita Yoshio TV Drama Series regular by Fuji TV  (2008)
No One Can Protect You TV Drama by Fuji TV (2009)
 Douki by WOWOW (2011)

Commercial
UNIQLO
KIRIN
TOYOTA

Music Video
Jazz NEKO “Confusion The Live”
Aloha “China Town”, Lead
BOOM BOOM satellites “Lock me out”,Lead
Kirinji “Pray, Don't curse”
J. Williams “Never Let Go”, Lead

Modeling
Chanel
Fendi
Armani
Hugo boss
John Galliano
VALENTINO
Paul KA
Y's
Rolex
Panasonic
Shiseido
Wella
VANS
Levi's
DIESEL

References

External links
 official website
 
 
 
YouTube Channel

1980 births
People from Fukuoka
Japanese female models
Japanese film actresses
Japanese television actresses
Living people
Actors from Fukuoka Prefecture
Avex Group talents
20th-century Japanese actresses
21st-century Japanese actresses
Models from Fukuoka Prefecture